Brett Gareth Sylvia (born September 12, 1972) is a United States Army major general who has served as the Vice Director for Strategy, Plans, and Policy of the Joint Staff since July 2021. Previously, he was the Deputy Commanding General (Maneuver) of the 1st Cavalry Division. Sylvia is a 1994 graduate of the United States Military Academy with a B.S. degree in environmental engineering. He later earned an M.S. degree in engineering management from the Missouri University of Science and Technology and a Master of Military Arts and Sciences degree from the School of Advanced Military Studies at the Army Command and General Staff College.

References

External links
 

1972 births
Living people
Place of birth missing (living people)
United States Military Academy alumni
United States Army Rangers
Missouri University of Science and Technology alumni
United States Army Command and General Staff College alumni
United States Army personnel of the Iraq War
United States Army personnel of the War in Afghanistan (2001–2021)
Recipients of the Legion of Merit
United States Army generals